Martin Scherber (16 January 1907 – 10 January 1974)
was a German composer and the creator of what he described as "metamorphosis symphonies".

Childhood and youth 
Martin Scherber was born as the third child of Marie and Bernhard Scherber in Nuremberg, where his father was First Bassist in the orchestra of the State Opera House. Martin was a quiet child, both alert and dreamy, always full of questions. With his great gift for everything technical, it was generally assumed he would become an engineer and for this reason he attended the secondary modern High School (Oberrealschule, today: Hans Sachs Gymnasium). But already early, at about five years of age, he began to play everything on the piano by heart. He had the absolute hearing. He didn't want to learn any notes, but after conflicts with his father he accepted them as a mean of the representation of music. Later his strength lay in improvising. He seemed to be immediately at home in music. At the age of thirteen he made his first compositions. At this time he was having advanced piano lessons with the Nuremberg opera conductor, Karl Winkler. He made his first public appearances as a pianist in 1922. In composing and improvising he felt enwrapped in a sheet of music. He could step out of his everyday consciousness into an independent, more awake consciousness. He stepped behind the walls, as he called it. From then on he tried to find a more accurate foundation for these experiences which were at first puzzling for him.

Education 
Since September 1925 he attended the State Academy of Music in Munich for which he received a stipendium. At the same time he was studying philosophy. Here he also occupied himself with basic theoretical questions of knowledge, that is, the integration of an active selfconsciousness within a consciousness for the world. In accordance with his nature, this process merged totally with his artistic life. Under this double aspect his biography appears in a special light. In September 1929 he took a position as répétiteur in Aussig on the River Elbe and after a short time he became conductor and choir leader. 
He withdrew from the public scene in May 1933. From then on he lived as free-lance composer and music teacher again in the city of his birth.

Metamorphosis-Symphonies 

There he created the Symphony No.1 in d minor (written in 1938). Years of experience as a soldier (1940-46 military service: anti-aircraft-artillery on railway, music corps, medical service, prison camp 'Munsterlager') in World War II stirred him for a long time. So one can see the 2. Symphony in f minor (1951–1952), and the 3. Symphony in b minor (1952–1955), which followed this directly, as a more important continuation of his musical path which began with the d-minor-Symphony. The composer called them 'Metamorphosis-Symphonies'. These symphonies are his main work.

He also composed instrumental music, works for the choir, songs and pieces for the piano. To this belonged the "ABC", a piano cycle in which he attempts to catch the mood of German sounds of speech.

Contemporaries 
Scherber moved in a different spiritual sphere from the avant garde who were composing in the fifties. The latter experimented with technical and electronic media, which led to serial and chance compositions. They wanted to replace all the usual rules for the buildup of music with own ways of treatment. Beyond this, they strove to create a world-music through taking in musical elements from as many cultures as possible, appropriate for the scientific-technical-industrial civilization of the whole world. Next to this, many composers continued in the style of composition usual until now.

For Scherber, each tone was an inner act, a free deed – and no intellectual, emotional or instinctive action connected it with other tones. He moved in the world of tone which he opened up as a discoverer does with a new continent, with all its happenings. He loved music and lived it—music which, he sometimes said, would be inscribed in each human being, even when, in our present time, it is not yet in our personal consciousness. To his F-minor symphony he wrote in 1962 to Peter von Siemens: "I may perhaps suggest, that just this 2nd symphony is not a composition but a Mysterium - also for me! ... Like a prospective mother I experienced the process of bringing it forth, only not so unconsciously; experienced, how those world powers which create mankind, wanted to reveal themselves in an audible way." There it showed that he was on a spiritual path as a learner. He spoke, as also others of his generation, from an active, new beginning in music which had to be consciously formed and which would lead far above the present classical heights. It was a matter of entering a New World – a source of everything creative, which - not only for music - could be reached under certain conditions. From this come the consequence, stringency and intelligence of his symphonic language.

Characteristics 
In the organic symphony forms conceived by Scherber live, rather hidden, new contents. Without wanting to go the inner way from 'Idea' or 'Emotion' and so on, to 'spiritual beinghood', the standards are lacking. The musical moving force for the new qualities become the themes which centralize everything with their weaving metamorphoses  and strict rhythms, as also the dissonances and harmonies.

For Scherber, the symphony in its universality matured through the centuries, was the historic resounding of human striving to consciously partake in the processes of world creation. Consistently, Scherber's symphonies show a relationship with the works and intentions of the great pacemakers of symphonic tone. Could one not hear ever and again from composers, not only from Ludwig van Beethoven: "It belongs to the rhythm of spirit, to grasp music in its beinghood. It gives a presentiment, an inspiration of heavenly knowledge."
And this has only sense in our day, when it can produce 'content' through experience.

Criticism 
"This music should be forbidden." (Hans Börnsen, 1957, after the première of the 2nd symphony, Archive of Bruckner-Kreis Nuremberg: A-BRK-N)
"...without any musical creative power." (Bruno Walter, in a letter to the composer on 25 April 1957, about the 3rd symphony, A-BRK-N)
"We don´t want such music." (Alfons Dressel, GMD of Nuremberg in the fifties, A-BRK-N)
"The music is too much out of time. And that it uses no appropriate, conformist tone language, a language to be seriously understood today, seems to me its greatest mistake, indeed, and may be a fatal one. It is an absolute anachronism." (Peter Huber, letter of 5 May 2005. A-BRK-N)
"I find the piano pieces by Martin Scherber which I was sent very good." (Edwin Fischer, on the 'ABC Piano Pieces')
"Thank you very much for your appreciative comments on my book 'Talks about music' [...] Your piano arrangement seems to me to be true and sensitive - and that is the best thing one can say of a piano arrangement." (Wilhelm Furtwängler - on the piano arrangement of Bruckner's Symphonies by Martin Scherber, A-BRK-N)
"This is real music again! Let it be performed!" (Siegfried Horvath, in the fifties, to the 1st symphony, A-BRK-N)
"...as profounnd and wide as the sea, nowhere fabricated, always interesting, never intellectual - and always alive..." (Karl Winkler, in the seventies, to the 3rd symphony, A-BRK-N)
"The composer has radically renewed the form of the genre without makeng perception more difficult"[...] "All the more astonishing was Scherber's symphony for me: it is modern and at the same time not modern, it is timeless. Only a great spirit could ignore, in total command of the situation, the usual ways of 'modernizing' the musical language, and out of his own depths form a mode of expression which has nothing to do with the unmusical experiments of the century, while still sounding absolutely original." (George Balan, about the 3rd symphony, in 2004, A-BRK-N)
"One feels one isn't any more listening to music but taking part in cosmic events and the mysteries of Creation." (Lilo Hammann-Rauno, in the fifties)

Publication 
The composer had intended to publish his symphonies only after his death. But in 1969 the idea was brought to Scherber to do it sooner. In this way the symphonies appeared in Nuremberg as immediate contributions to Albrecht-Dürer-Year 1971 (500th Anniversary of birth).

Accident 
At the end of May 1970, during a walk, he was struck by a drunken driver and thrown through the air. In this way he was robbed of his physical faculties to continue with his musical work and confined over years to a wheelchair. At the beginning of 1974 he died from the consequences of the accident.

Selected works 
"Das ABC - Stücke für Klavier"; ABC - 31 Pieces for Piano (1938–63).
"Hymne an die Nacht"; Hymn to the Night (1937) (Novalis; song with piano).
Cycles of Children's Songs (1930/1937) (Clemens Brentano, Martin Scherber)
Fairytale music (1938, 1946)
Symphony No. 1 in d-minor (1938), world premiere: 11 March 1952, Lüneburg; Conductor: Fred Thürmer
Symphony No. 2 in f-minor (1951–52), WP: 24 January 1957, Lüneburg; Conductor: Fred Thürmer
Symphony No. 3 in b-minor (1952–55), WP: not yet
Lieder mit Klavier (1930–1950); Songs for piano (Wilhelm Busch, J. W. von Goethe, Eduard Mörike, Christian Morgenstern)
Choirs a capella and choirs with piano or orchestra (1937/38)

Discography 
Symphony No. 3 in b-minor (3. Symphonie in h-moll durch Martin Scherber). German Philharmonic Orchestra Rhineland-Palatinate (Deutsche Staatsphilharmonie Rheinland-Pfalz), Ludwigshafen. Conductor: Elmar Lampson. Publisher: Peermusic Classical, Hamburg. Label: col legno, Wien-Salzburg, Austria, www.col-legno.com; WWE 1CD 20078. World Premiere Recording - 2001.
Symphony No. 2 in f-minor (2. Symphonie in f-moll durch Martin Scherber). Russian Philharmonic Orchestra Moscow. Conductor: Samuel Friedmann. Publisher: Bruckner-Kreis Nürnberg. Label: Cascade Media, Staufen im Breisgau, Germany www.cascade-medien.com, Order-No. 05116. World Premiere Recording - 2010.
Symphony No. 1 in D minor; Seven Songs on Poems by Goethe; Main Cycle of Children's Songs; Short Cycle of Children's Songs; Hymn to the Night; Various songs. Bratislava Symphony Orchestra. Conductor: Adriano (symphony) / Thomas Heyer & Hedayet Djeddikar (songs). Sterling CDS1113-2. World Premiere Recording, 2018.

References

External links 
 - Website: Martin Scherber - media to listen

 British Library integrated catalogue - Online catalogues of printed and electronic resources -  UK - London.
 Library of Congress Online Catalog, Washington.
 Library and Archives Canada (Nationalbibliothek Canada); Ottawa, Québec.
 Australian Library Collections.

20th-century classical composers
German classical composers
Composers for piano
1907 births
1974 deaths
Musicians from Nuremberg
Road incident deaths in Germany
Pedestrian road incident deaths
German male classical composers
20th-century German composers
20th-century German male musicians